Pickhurst is a grade II* listed house set in  of land near Chiddingfold, Surrey, England.

History 

It was designed by the Scottish architect J.M. Brydon in 1885 as his own home. The design was influenced by the style of Norman Shaw. In the 1950s a fire badly damaged the original service wing and internal courtyard necessitating their demolition. The building subsequently underwent a six-year renovation by Ian Adam-Smith.

References 

Grade II* listed houses
Grade II* listed buildings in Surrey
Houses completed in 1885
Buildings designed by J. M. Brydon

See also 
 Grade II* listed buildings in Waverley, Surrey